Tsuneonella troitsensis is a Gram-negative, aerobic, halotolerant, rod-shaped and motile bacterium from the genus Tsuneonella which has been isolated from the sea urchin Strongylocentrotus intermedius.

References

External links
Type strain of Tsuneonella troitsensis at BacDive -  the Bacterial Diversity Metadatabase

Further reading 
 

Sphingomonadales
Bacteria described in 2013
Halophiles